Barry Brown is the name of:

Barry Brown (actor) (1951–1978), American author, playwright and actor
Barry Brown (American football) (born 1943), former American professional football linebacker and tight end
Barry Brown (attorney), American professor at Suffolk University Law School
Barry Brown (boxer) (1931–2004), New Zealand boxer of the 1950s
Barry Brown (Canadian musician) (born 1952), Canadian country music singer-songwriter
Barry Brown (director), American film director
Barry Brown (singer) (1962–2004), Jamaican reggae singer
Barry Brown (volleyball) (born 1934), American former volleyball player
Barry Brown Jr. (born 1996) American basketball player
Barry Alexander Brown (born 1960), American film editor and director

See also
Barrie Brown (1931–2014), former Australian rules football player
Barry v. Brown
Brown (surname), an English-language surname in origin chiefly descriptive of a person with brown hair, complexion or clothing